The 1925–26 Boston Bruins season was the team's second season in the NHL. The Bruins finished fourth in the league standings, failing to make the playoffs.

Regular season

Opening the season with a 2–1 loss to the expansion Pittsburgh Pirates,  it looked initially as if the Bruins would turn in as poor a season as the year before, as they won only two of their first ten games, and after two consecutive wins, turned in an 0–5–3 record for most of January.

From a 5–0 shutout victory over the Maroons on January 30, however, the Bruins won 13 of their last 17 games, a 2–1 overtime loss to the Pirates on March 12 being the difference to lose out on a playoff berth to Pittsburgh by a single point.  The winning percentage improvement of .328 from the previous season was a NHL record at the time, and remains the third best single season improvement ever.

A healthy Carson Cooper contributed to a near doubling of goals scored to lead the league, while the purchase of veteran star defenseman Sprague Cleghorn from the Montreal Maroons for $5000 solidified the defense – despite a knee injury in the opener against Pittsburgh that sidelined Cleghorn for a month – and saw goals allowed decline by over a third. Cooper and Jimmy "Sailor" Herbert finished second and third respectively in the league scoring race, behind Nels Stewart of the Maroons.

Among other debuts was that of goaltender Moe Roberts, at age 19 the second youngest player in the league and its first Jewish player. Roberts would wind up with one of the longest professional careers on record, playing his final game for the Chicago Black Hawks in 1951, the oldest player ever to play in the NHL, prior to Gordie Howe. He was the youngest player ever to play goal for twenty years, until surpassed by future Bruin Harry Lumley.

Final standings

Record vs. opponents

Schedule and results

Playoffs
The Bruins did not qualify for the playoffs.

Player statistics

Leading scorers
Note: GP = Games played; G = Goals; A = Assists; Pts = Points; PIM = Penalty minutes

Goaltenders
Note: GP = Games played; Min = Minutes; W = Wins; L = Losses; T = Ties; GA = Goals against; SO = Shutouts; GAA = Goals against average

Transactions
 Purchased Sprague Cleghorn from the Montreal Maroons for $5,000.

See also
1925–26 NHL season

References

Boston Bruins seasons
Boston
Boston
Boston Bruins
Boston Bruins
1920s in Boston